Ballagh may refer to:

Places

Ireland
Ballagh, Tipperary, a village in Co. Tipperary
 Ballagh, Kilcumreragh, a townland in Kilcumreragh civil parish, barony of Moycashel, County Westmeath
 Ballagh, Mullingar, a townland in Mullingar civil parish, barony of Moyashel and Maheradermon, County Westmeath
 The Ballagh, a village in County Wexford

Other
 Faugh-a-Ballagh, a Thoroughbred race horse
 Faugh A Ballagh, a battle cry of Irish origin
 Oulart the Ballagh, a Gaelic Athletic Association club in County Wexford
 Robert Ballagh (born 1943), an Irish artist